Brynhildur Davíðsdóttir (or Brynhildur Davidsdottir; born 29 July 1968) is a professor of environment and natural resources at the University of Iceland and the academic director of the Environment and Natural Resources graduate programme as well as the director of University of Iceland Arctic Initiative.

Brynhildur a native of Iceland originally studied biology and economics at University of Iceland and later System dynamics in the context of climate change mitigation and energy transitions.  Drawing on her background in biology and economics she also has focused on evaluation of ecosystem services in various contexts as well as sustainability indicators.

In addition to her academic commitments, she actively participates in policy-making and sits currently in a government-appointed committee tasked to create future energy policy for Iceland.  She has since 2008 been responsible for assessing greenhouse gas mitigation options for the Icelandic government, sits on the government-appointed science committee on climate change impact in Iceland, and is the vice chair of the Icelandic Climate Council.

Brynhildur is an active board member of several foundations and companies. She is the chairman of the board of Reykjavik Energy, the second largest energy company in Iceland.  Reykjavik Energy´s operation in Hellisheiði is the site of the CarbFix project In the CarbFix project, carbon dioxide is captured from the emissions from the geothermal power plant in Hellisheiði.  It is then dissolved in water and injected into subsurface basalts.  Research has confirmed that the injected  becomes solidified into calcite in two years, effectively turning carbon dioxide into stone.   Brynhildur also sits on the board of the Arctic Circle Foundation, which is a foundation that hosts one of the largest annual international gathering on the Arctic.

In March 2020, Dr. Davidsdóttir was appointed to the Scottish Council of Economic Advisers.

Academic career
Brynhildur completed a BS degree in biology from University of Iceland in 1991, and a preparatory programme in to a degree in economics from University of Iceland in 1992.  She competed a dual MS degree from Boston University in International Relations and Environment and natural resource management and a PhD from Boston University Center for Energy and Environmental Studies.

After completing her PhD in 2002, she was an adjunct lecturer at Boston University until 2005. She was a research associate at University of Maryland College Park from 2004 - 2005, and an associate at Abt Associates Inc from 2004 to 2006.  In 2006 she moved to Iceland, and became a professor at University of Iceland, tasked with building an international and interdisciplinary graduate programme focused on Environment and Natural Resources.  In 2012, Brynhildur received the University of Iceland´s highest honor for excellence in teaching and in 2018 was honored as the Scientist of the year by the Icelandic Science Academy.

Selected publications
Brynhildur's research has focused on four main areas; energy transitions, climate change mitigation, sustainability measurement indicators and ecosystem services.

D Cook, L Malinauskaite, B Davíðsdóttir, H Ögmundardóttir, J Roman, 2020, 
Reflections on the ecosystem services of whales and valuing their contribution to human well-being, 
Ocean & Coastal Management 186, 105100. 
https://doi.org/10.1016/j.ocecoaman.2020.105100

N Spittler, B Davidsdottir, E Shafiei, J Leaver, EI Asgeirsson, H Stefansson, 2020, 
The role of geothermal resources in sustainable power system planning in Iceland, 
Renewable Energy, 153: 1081-1090.
https://doi.org/10.1016/j.renene.2020.02.046

E Shafiei, B Davidsdottir, H Stefansson, EI Asgeirsson, R Fazeli, M. Gestsson, J Leaver, 2019, 
Simulation-based appraisal of tax-induced electro-mobility promotion in Iceland and prospects for energy-economic development, 
Energy Policy 133, 110894
https://doi.org/10.1016/j.enpol.2019.110894

JÖG Jónsson, B Davíðsdóttir, NP Nikolaidis, GV Giannakis, 2019, 
Tools for Sustainable Soil Management: 
Soil Ecosystem Services, EROI and Economic Analysis, Ecological Economics 157 (C), 109-119.
https://doi.org/10.1016/j.ecolecon.2018.11.010

L Malinauskaite, D Cook, B Davíðsdóttir, H Ögmundardóttir, J Roman, 2019, 
Ecosystem services in the Arctic: a thematic review, 
Ecosystem services 36, 100898
https://doi.org/10.1016/j.ecoser.2019.100898

D Cook, R Fazeli, B Davíðsdóttir, 2019, 
The need for integrated valuation tools to support decision-making–The case of cultural ecosystem services sourced from geothermal areas, 
Ecosystem Services 37, 100923
https://doi.org/10.1016/j.ecoser.2019.100923

Shafiei, E., B. Davidsdottir, R. Fazeli, J. Leaver, H. Stefansson, E.I. Asgeirsson, 2018, 
Macroeconomic effects of fiscal incentives to promote electric vehicles in Iceland: Implications for government and consumer costs, 
Energy Policy, 114:431- 443.
https://doi.org/10.1016/j.enpol.2017.12.034

AM Eikeset, AB Mazzarella, B Davíðsdóttir, DH Klinger, SA Levin and N Stenseth, 2018, 
What is blue growth? The semantics of “Sustainable Development” of marine environments, 
Marine Policy 87: 177-179.
https://doi.org/10.1016/j.marpol.2017.10.019

Shafiei, E., B Davidsdottir, J Leaver, H Stefansson, EI Asgeirsson, 2017, 
Energy, economic, and mitigation cost implications of transition toward a carbon-neutral transport sector: A simulation-based comparison between hydrogen and electricity, 
Journal of Cleaner Production 141, 237-247.
https://doi.org/10.1016/j.jclepro.2016.09.064

Shortall R., B Davidsdottir, 2017, 
How to measure national energy sustainability performance: An Icelandic case-study, 
Energy for Sustainable Development 39, 29-47.
https://doi.org/10.1016/j.esd.2017.03.005

Jónsson JÖG, B Davíðsdóttir, NP Nikolaidis, 2017, 
Valuation of Soil Ecosystem Services, Advances in Agronomy, 
vol: 142: 353-384.
https://doi.org/10.1016/bs.agron.2016.10.011

Cook D., NM Saviolidis, B Davíðsdóttir, L Jóhannsdóttir, 2017, 
Measuring countries’ environmental sustainability performance—The development of a nation-specific indicator set, Ecological Indicators, 
74: 463-478.
https://doi.org/10.1016/j.ecolind.2016.12.009

IEA, 2016, 
Nordic Energy Technology Perspectives Pathways to a Carbon Neutral Energy Future, IEA and NER, Paris. 
(BD led the Icelandic team in this IEA effort).
https://www.nordicenergy.org/project/nordic-energy-technology-perspectives/

Shafiei, E., B Davidsdottir, J Leaver, H Stefansson, EI Asgeirsson, 2015, 
Comparative analysis of hydrogen, biofuels and electricity transitional pathways to sustainable transport in a renewable-based energy system, 
Energy 83:614-627.
https://doi.org/10.1016/j.enpol.2017.12.034

References

External links
University of Iceland Masters Programme in Environment and Natural Resources 
RES – The School for Renewable Energy Science
Boston University Center for Energy and Environmental Studies

Davidsdottir, Brynhildur
Davidsdottir, Brynhildur
Davidsdottir, Brynhildur
Icelandic economists
Davidsdottir, Brynhildur
Boston University faculty
Academic staff of the University of Iceland